Public Lands Interpretive Association (PLIA) is a cooperating (or interpretive) association whose mission is to “inspire and educate the public about the natural and cultural heritage resources of America’s public lands.” PLIA operates https://www.publiclands.org where maps can be purchased and an interactive recreation map can be accessed to find public lands sites.
PLIA provides those wanting to visit public lands with information and educational materials such as up-to-date fire news and alerts, and an online map center with Bureau of Land Management, Forest Service, and other maps helpful to users of public lands.

PLIA  is one of more than hundred 501c(3) not-for-profit interpretive associations which support public land agencies throughout the United States. The national umbrella organization of interpretive associations is the Public Lands Alliance.

History
PLIA (formerly Southwest Natural and Cultural Heritage Association) was formed in 1981, and is affiliated with the USDA Forest Service and the Bureau of Land Management.

Revenues are derived from PLIA sales outlets, a campground concession, publishing and product development, online sales, donations. Net revenues support PLIA’s interpretive and educational efforts.

Sales Outlets and Areas Managed by PLIA

Arizona
USDA Forest Service:
Apache Sitgreaves NF:
Clifton Ranger District Office, Clifton

Coronado NF:

Sabino Canyon Visitor Center, Tucson

Palisades Visitor Center, Mt. Lemmon

Sierra Vista Ranger District Office, Hereford

New Mexico
USDA Forest Service:
Gila NF:

Glenwood Ranger District Office, Glenwood

Lincoln NF:

Sacramento Ranger District Office, Cloudcroft

Smokey Bear Ranger District Office, Ruidoso

Bureau of Land Management:
Fort Craig Historic Site, Socorro
New Mexico Public Lands Information Center, Santa Fe
Rio Grande Gorge Visitor Center, Pilar
Wild Rivers Recreation Area, Cerro

Art Zimmerman Visitors Center

Valley of Fires National Recreation Area,  Carrizozo

 Valley of Fires National Recreation Area Visitor Center

Campgrounds
Since 1991, PLIA has operated four campgrounds, doing business as Southwest Recreation, under a special use permit on the Williams Ranger District of the Kaibab National Forest near Williams, Arizona.

Campground locations:
Kaibab Lake
White Horse Lake
Dogtown Lake

American Frontiers: A Public Lands Journey 

In 2002, PLIA mapped out a Canada-to-Mexico trek exclusively on public lands called American Frontiers: A Public Lands Journey. This was the first trek through the United States done entirely on public land.

Publications

References

Non-profit organizations based in the United States